Emily Dickson (born May 23, 1997) is a Canadian biathlete from Burns Lake, British Columbia.

Career

Junior
Dickson made her debut as part of Canada's team at the Biathlon World Youth Championships in 2013. At the 2015 Canada Winter Games, Dickson won three medals in the biathlon events, one of each colour.

Senior
Dickson started the 2021–22 season by competing on the IBU Cup tour. In January 2022, Dickson was called up to the 2021–22 Biathlon World Cup team, finishing 60th in the sprint event.

In January 2022, Dickson was named to Canada's 2022 Olympic team.

References

1997 births
Living people
Canadian female biathletes
Biathletes at the 2022 Winter Olympics
Olympic biathletes of Canada
People from the Regional District of Bulkley-Nechako
21st-century Canadian women